Alectown is a town in the Central West region of New South Wales, Australia. The town is on the Newell Highway and in the Parkes Shire local government area, west north west of the state capital, Sydney.

History
Originally known as Alecs Flat, the district was named after the three men who first prospected here - Alexander Cameron, Alexander Patton, and Alexander Whitelaw.

It was originally a gold mining town which once had a population above 1,000. Bachelors Rush Post Office opened on 1 May 1888 and was renamed Alicktown in 1889 and Alectown in 1891. It closed in 1983.
Today, only two churches and some residences remain in the town.

Telescope
Alectown is the actual address of the Parkes Radio Telescope operated by the CSIRO, the largest radio telescope in Australia, which is used for both theoretical research and on NASA projects including the moon landings.

Notable residents
 Scott Westcott
 Kenneth Mulligan OAM MAICD (Ken Mulligan)

See also 
 Houston, New South Wales

References

Towns in New South Wales
Towns in the Central West (New South Wales)
Newell Highway
Parkes Shire
Mining towns in New South Wales